Tartu Students' Nature Conservation Circle is a nature conservation organization (society) at the University of Tartu.

Established in 1958, it is the oldest student nature conservation society in the world.

It has been continuously active since then. As preparing the environmental activists of the country, it had a remarkable role in the Phosphorite War that influenced the destabilization and destruction of the Soviet Union in the end of 1980s.

Among the presidents of society there have been Toomas Frey, Ann Marvet, Mari Reitalu, Rein Ahas and many others.

References

University of Tartu
Nature conservation in Estonia
Environmentalism in Estonia
1958 establishments in the Soviet Union
Environmental organizations established in 1958
Environmental organizations based in Estonia
Student organizations in Estonia